José Souto (20 December 1959 – 15 January 2019) was a French professional football player and manager.

Early and personal life
Souto was born in Arzúa, Spain. He was married with two children. He was also an amateur tennis player.

Career
Souto played as a defensive midfielder for Thionville, Metz, Laval, Strasbourg, Tours, Lens and Quimper.

He also served as manager of Thionville between 1992 and 2000.

Later life and death
He later worked as a consultant for TV channels Orange Sport and beIN Sports.

He died on 15 January 2019, at the age of 59.

References

1959 births
2019 deaths
French footballers
Spanish footballers
Thionville FC players
FC Metz players
Stade Lavallois players
RC Strasbourg Alsace players
Tours FC players
RC Lens players
Quimper Kerfeunteun F.C. players
Ligue 1 players
Ligue 2 players
Association football midfielders
French football managers
Thionville FC managers